The Mind of Mr. J.G. Reeder is a British television series which was originally broadcast on ITV in two series from 1969 to 1971. It is based on a series of novels and short stories written by Edgar Wallace featuring the character of J.G. Reeder, who had appeared in several film adaptations in the late 1930s. Sixteen episodes were made, all but two in black-and-white.

Reeder is a mild-mannered employee at the Department of Public Prosecutions with an extraordinary gift for solving complex crimes. He is played by Hugh Burden, working under the overbearing Sir Jason Toovey (Willoughby Goddard). It is set in the 1920s, when the stories were originally written, and the graphics of the opening credits reflect this Jazz Age setting.

The series has been released in Region 2 DVD.

Main cast
Hugh Burden as Mr. J.G. Reeder
Willoughby Goddard as Sir Jason Toovey
Mona Bruce as Mrs. Houchin
Gillian Lewis as Miss Belman
Virginia Stride as Margaret Belman
Windsor Davies as Chief Inspector Pyne
Mark Dignam as Lord Nettlefold
Geoffrey Lumsden as Lord Rothbard
Alison McMurdo as Miss Pangbourne
Harry Towb as Lew Kassio
David Steuart as judge
Amanda Barrie as Ethel Gibson

See also
Mr. Reeder in Room 13 (1938)
Room 13 (1964)

References

External links

1960s British crime television series
1970s British crime television series
ITV television dramas
Television shows set in London
1969 British television series debuts
1971 British television series endings
1960s British drama television series
1970s British drama television series
English-language television shows
Television shows produced by Thames Television
British detective television series
Television series set in the 1920s